Freeze thaw resistance, or freezing and thawing resistance, is the property of solids to resist cyclic freezing and melting.

See also
 Frost weathering

Further reading 
 
 

Phase transitions
Condensed matter physics